Encased: A Sci-Fi Post-Apocalyptic RPG, is an isometric turn-based RPG developed by Dark Crystal Games and inspired by games like Fallout and Wasteland as well as Soviet-era sci-fi novel Roadside Picnic. The game was released in early access on Microsoft Windows on September 26, 2019, and its full release was on September 7, 2021.

Gameplay 
The gameplay is inspired by classic computer RPGs such as Fallout, Wasteland and Shadowrun. It features a turn-based combat system with an isometric camera view. One of the game's distinguishing features is its emphasis on storybuilding, with the player's decisions affecting the rest of the gameplay in one way or another.

Character customization is a key feature, along with a reputation system where a character's reputation can change due to player choice. While the player begins with only one character of their creation, various companions can also join them along the way.

Story 
Game events unfold in alternative '70s. The story of the game tells us about the study of the Dome, a huge building discovered in one of the remote deserts. Nobody knows who built the Dome, but in official documents of researchers this civilization is called the Forefathers.

In the labyrinths below the Dome, there are many amazing examples of advanced technology and strange artifacts protected by automatic defence systems, traps and anomalies. Aside from that, the special field of the Dome does not allow those who got inside to leave it. Research of the Dome is carried out by CRONUS Corporation, an international organization founded by the governments of the most influential world powers. CRONUS is divided into five departments called Wings, each of which reports to its own leader, has its own specialization and history.

Development 
May 18, 2018 Encased development was announced by Russian studio Dark Crystal Games. After the game's announcement, Dark Crystal Games were considering additional funding avenues. This ended in the September 2018 launch of the Kickstarter campaign, that was aiming to expand the game content, not funding it

The full release was on September 7, 2021. Under the wing of Prime Matter Publishing, a subsidiary of Koch Media.

The developers have published a roadmap with plans for further content development for the game through the spring of 2022.

Reception 

Encased received an aggregate score of 73/100 from Metacritic, indicating "mixed or average reviews".

Martynas Klimas of PC Invasion gave the game a 9/10, saying: "All in all, Encased is a good-to-great CRPG and a rip-roaring Kickstarter success." Francesco De Meo of Wccftech gave the game a 7.7 out of 10, writing, "Encased: A Sci-Fi Post-Apocalyptic RPG is a worthy purchase for all fans of classic Fallout games, thanks to a well-crafted post-apocalyptic setting, great worldbuilding, reactive world, and solid overall gameplay." Jeuxvideo gave the game a 14/20, saying: "Very responsive, fairly faithful to its inspirations, Encased knows how to offer a complete RPG, which intelligently responds to the decisions you make. Unfortunately, the title stumbles on its combat portion, rather failed and too anchored in the past, and is sometimes confused in the follow-up of the objectives to be accomplished. A pleasant experience, but not unforgettable, therefore, reserved for fans of old-school C-RPG." Alberto Naso of Eurogamer Italia gave the game a 7/10, saying: "Encased is an interesting CRPG set in a dystopian alternative past that pays tribute to the original Fallout 1 & 2 for gameplay and core mechanics. Good storytelling and visuals. The combat lacks a bit of depth and strategy, but overall a good gaming experience."

References

External links 
 
2021 video games
Alternate history video games
Video games developed in Russia
Post-apocalyptic video games
Windows games
Windows-only games
Role-playing video games
Single-player video games
Indie video games
Early access video games
Video games set in the 1970s
Video games with isometric graphics